Symmoca perobscurata is a moth of the Symmocidae family. It is found in Portugal and Spain.

References

Moths described in 1957
Symmoca